AATW may refer to:

 Airborne, All the Way, motto of American Paratroopers
 All Along the Watchtower, a song written by Bob Dylan
 All Along the Watchtower, a British sitcom
 All Around the World Productions, a record company
 Anarchists Against the Wall, an Israeli direct action group
 Asleep at the Wheel, an American western swing band